The Pacaraima or Pakaraima Mountains are a mountain range primarily in southwestern Guyana, and into northern Brazil and eastern Venezuela.

Geography

It is geologically part of the Guayana Shield and biogeographically part of the Guayana Highlands.The mountains form the divide between the Orinoco Valley to the north and the Amazon Basin to the south. They also serve as a natural boundary in the east–west direction, where they extend  to form a border marker between Brazil and southeastern Venezuela and between Brazil and west central Guyana.

Geology 
The Pacaraimas are a sandstone plateau underlain by a horizonal precambrian marine strata that arose in post-cretaceous time. Erosion of the sandstone (the Roraima Supergroup) results in dramatic escarpments, the individual remnants of which are called tepuis. Mount Roraima, Mount Ayanganna and Mount Wokomung are some of the more well-known examples.

Numerous rivers originate in these mountains and on their way down they plunge spectacularly to form some picturesque waterfalls. A beautiful example of this is the Kaieteur Falls in Guyana and Angel Falls. The headwaters of the Mazaruni River and Ireng River are sourced in the Pacaraimas.

Ecology
The Pacaraimas are mostly forested, with occasional savannas especially at the base of Roraima and on the Brazilian side of the range. The savannas are made up of grasses and the occasional Curatella americana trees below 6500 ft. These areas are prone to fire, either man-made for agriculture or cattle ranching or during times of drought.

Difficulty in breaching the steep slopes has made data collection a challenge, however the relative isolation of these flat-topped mountains produces an array of endemic flora with a "great potential for high species diversity". The Rapateaceae family is one of the most commonly represented of flowering plants amid the tepui plateaus.

Conservation
Logging and mining interests pose a threat to the biodiversity of the Pacaraimas.

The  Monte Roraima National Park protects part of the range in Roraima, Brazil.

Settlement 
The mountains are a traditional home to Patamona and Macushi people. 

The Macushi village of Tipuru is considered the oldest village in the South Pakaraima Mountains. It has the oldest church and school in the region.

Landmarks are of special significance to indigenous people, and are intertwined with oral histories and culture. According to Macushi cosmology, mountains and other landforms were created by mythical creator brothers when they cut down Wayaka, the "tree of life". These brothers transformed people, animals, and other things into rock formations, thus giving them special mythological origins.

See also
 
 
Geography of Guyana

References

Mountain ranges of Brazil
Mountain ranges of Guyana
Mountain ranges of Venezuela
Guayana Highlands
Mountains of Bolívar (state)
Landforms of Roraima
Brazil–Guyana border
Brazil–Venezuela border
Guyana–Venezuela border